Annona sylvatica (syn. Rollinia sylvatica) is a species of flowering plant in the family Annonaceae, native to Brazil. Its plentiful fruit is edible and is regularly gathered in the wild by locals, and it is occasionally cultivated. It is considered a good species to use for reforestry projects, as it is very fast growing when young.

References

sylvatica
Endemic flora of Brazil
Flora of West-Central Brazil
Flora of Northeast Brazil
Flora of Southeast Brazil
Flora of South Brazil
Plants described in 1824